The Dean of Newcastle is the head (primus inter pares – first among equals) and chair of the chapter of canons, the ruling body of Newcastle Cathedral. The dean and chapter are based at the Cathedral Church of Saint Nicholas, Newcastle upon Tyne. Before 2000 the post was designated as a provost, which was then the equivalent of a dean at most English cathedrals. The cathedral is the mother church of the Diocese of Newcastle and seat of the Bishop of Newcastle.

List of deans

Provosts
1931–1938 John Bateman-Champain
1938–1947 George Brigstocke
1947–1962 Noel Kennaby
1962–1976 Clifton Wolters
1976–1989 Christopher Spafford
1990–August 2001 Nicholas Coulton (became Dean)

Deans
August 2001–2003 Nicholas Coulton
2003–2018 Chris Dalliston
2018−2022: Geoff Miller
2023−present: Jane Hedges (acting)

References

Deans of Newcastle
Deans of Newcastle
 
Deans of Newcastle